Plant milk is a plant beverage with a color resembling that of milk. Plant milks are non-dairy beverages made from a water-based plant extract for flavoring and aroma. Plant milks are consumed as alternatives to milk, and often provide a creamy mouthfeel. There are about 17 different types of plant milks; almond, oat, soy, coconut, and pea are the highest-selling worldwide.
Production of plant-based milks, particularly soy, oat, and pea milks, can offer environmental advantages over animal milks in terms of greenhouse gas emissions, land and water use.

Plant-based beverages have been consumed for centuries, with the term "milk-like plant juices" used since the 13th century.  Today they are frequently referred to as plant-based milk, alternative milk, non-dairy milk or vegan milk. For commerce, plant-based beverages are typically packaged in containers similar and competitive to those used for dairy milk, but cannot be labeled as "milk" within the European Union.

Across various cultures, plant milk has been both a beverage and a flavourful ingredient in sweet and savory dishes, such as the use of coconut milk in curries. It is compatible with vegetarian and vegan lifestyles. Plant milks are also used to make ice cream alternatives, plant cream, vegan cheese, and yogurt-analogues, such as soy yogurt. In 2021 the global plant milk market was estimated to reach 62billion by 2030.

History
Before commercial production of 'milks' from legumes, beans and nuts, plant-based mixtures resembling milk have existed for centuries. The Wabanaki and other Native American tribal nations in the northeastern United States made milk and infant formula from nuts.

Horchata, a beverage originally made in North Africa from soaked, ground, and sweetened tiger nuts, spread to Iberia (now Spain) before the year 1000. In English, the word "milk" has been used to refer to "milk-like plant juices" since 1200 CE.

Recipes from the 13th-century Levant exist describing almond milk. Soy was a plant milk used in China during the 14th century. In Medieval England, almond milk was used in dishes such as ris alkere (a type of rice pudding) and appears in the recipe collection, The Forme of Cury. Coconut milk (and coconut cream) are traditional ingredients in many cuisines such as in South and Southeast Asia, and are often used in curries.

Plant milks may be regarded as milk substitutes in Western countries, but have traditionally been consumed in other parts of the world, especially ones where there are higher rates of lactose intolerance (see especially lactose intolerance: epidemiology section).

Types

Common plant milks are almond milk, coconut milk, rice milk, and soy milk. Other plant milks include hemp milk, oat milk, pea milk, and peanut milk.

Plant milks can be made from:

Grains: barley, fonio, maize, millet, oat, rice, rye, sorghum, teff, triticale, spelt, wheat
Pseudocereals: amaranth, buckwheat, quinoa
Legumes: lupin, pea, peanut, soy
Nuts: almond, brazil, cashew, hazelnut, macadamia, pecan, pistachio, walnut
Seeds: chia seed, flax seed, hemp seed, pumpkin seed, sesame seed, sunflower seed
Other: coconut (fruit; drupe), potato (tuber), tiger nut (tuber)

A blend is a plant milk created by mixing two or more types together. Examples of blends are almond-coconut milk and almond-cashew milk.

Other traditional plant milk recipes include:

Kunu, a Nigerian beverage made from sprouted millet, sorghum, or maize
Sikhye, a traditional sweet Korean rice beverage
Amazake, a Japanese rice milk

Manufacturing

Although there are variations in the manufacturing of plant milks according to the starting plant material, as an example, the general technique for soy milk involves several steps, including: 
 cleaning, soaking and dehulling the beans
 grinding of the starting material to produce a slurry, powder or emulsion
 heating the processed plant material to denature lipoxidase enzymes to minimize their effects on flavor
 removing sedimentable solids by filtration
 adding water, sugar (or sugar substitutes) and other ingredients to improve flavour, aroma, and micronutrient content
 pasteurizing the pre-final liquid
 homogenizing the liquid to break down fat globules and particles for a smooth mouthfeel
 packaging, labeling and storage at 

The actual content of the highlighted plant in commercial plant milks may be only around 2%. Other ingredients commonly added to plant milks during manufacturing include guar gum, xanthan gum, or sunflower lecithin for texture and mouthfeel, select micronutrients (such as calcium, B vitamins, and vitamin D), salt, and natural or artificial ingredients—such as flavours characteristic of the featured plant—for aroma, color, and taste. Plant milks are also used to make ice cream, plant cream, vegan cheese, and yogurt-analogues, such as soy yogurt.

The production of almond-based dairy substitutes has been criticized on environmental grounds as large amounts of water and pesticides are used. The emissions, land, and water footprints of plant milks vary, due to differences in crop water needs, farming practices, region of production, production processes, and transportation. Production of plant-based milks, particularly soy and oat milks, can offer environmental advantages over animal milks in terms of greenhouse gas emissions, land and water use.

Nutritional comparison with cow's milk
Many plant milks aim to contain the same proteins, vitamins and lipids as those produced by lactating mammals. Generally, because plant milks are manufactured using processed extracts of the starting plant, plant milks are lower in nutrient density than dairy milk and are fortified during manufacturing to add precise levels of micronutrients, commonly calcium and Vitamins A and D. Animal milks are also commonly fortified, and many countries have laws mandating fortification of milk products with certain nutrients, commonly vitamins A and D.

Packaging and commerce

Plant-based milks have emerged as an alternative to dairy in response to consumer dietary requests and changing attitudes about animals and the environment. Huffington Post stated that due to health and environmental reasons as well as changing consumer trends, more individuals regularly buy non-dairy alternatives to milk. Between 1974 and 2020, dairy milk consumption of people aged between 16 and 24 in the United Kingdom decreased from 94% to 73%. In Australia, there is decreased confidence within the dairy industry, with only 53% being optimistic in the future profitability and demand for dairy products as per a Dairy Australia report.

To improve competition, plant milks are typically packaged in containers similar to those of dairy milks.  A scientific journal article argued that plant-milk companies send the message that plant milks are 'good and wholesome' and dairy milk is 'bad for the environment', and the article also reported that an increasing number of young people associate dairy with environmental damage. There has been an increased concern that dairy production has adverse effects on biodiversity, water and land use. These negative links between dairy and the environment have also been communicated through audiovisual material against dairy production, such as 'Cowspiracy' and 'What the Health'. Animal welfare concerns have also contributed to the declining popularity of dairy milk in many Western countries. Advertising for plant milks may also contrast the intensive farming effort to produce dairy milk with the relative ease of harvesting plant sources, such as oats, rice or soybeans. In 2021, an advertisement for oat milk brand Oatly aired during the Super Bowl.

In the United States, plant milk sales grew steadily by 61% over the period 2012 to 2018. As of 2019, the plant-based milk industry in the USA is worth $1.8 billion per year. In 2018, the value of 'dairy alternatives' around the world was said to be $8 billion. Among plant milks, almond (64% market share), soy (13% market share), and coconut (12% market share) were category leaders in the United States during 2018. Oat milk sales increased by 250% in Canada during 2019, and its growing consumption in the United States and United Kingdom led to production shortages from unprecedented consumer demand. In 2020, one major coffee retailer – Starbucks – added oat milk, coconut milk, and almond milk beverages to its menus in the United States and Canada. During 2020, oat milk sales in the United States increased to $213 million, becoming the second most consumed plant milk after almond milk ($1.5 billion in 2020 sales).

A key dietary reason for the increase in popularity of plant-based milks such as pea milks is lactose intolerance. For example, the most common food causing intolerance in Australia is lactose and affects 4.5% of the population. In the United States, around 40 million people are lactose intolerant.

Labeling and terminology 
One of the first reliable modern English dictionaries, Samuel Johnson's 1755 A Dictionary of the English Language, gave two definitions of the word "milk". The first described "the liquor with which animals feed their young from the breast", and the second an "emulsion made by contusion of seeds", using almond milk as an example.

As plant milks resurged in popularity in the late twentieth and early twenty first centuries, their definition became a matter of controversy. Plant milks may be labeled to highlight their nutrient contents, or with terms reflecting their composition or absence of ingredients, such as "dairy-free", "gluten-free" or "GMO-free". Manufacturers and distributors of animal milk have advocated that plant-based milk not be labelled as "milk". They complain that consumers may be confused between the two, and that plant-based milks are not necessarily as nutritious in terms of vitamins and minerals.

Europe
In December 2013, European Union regulations stated that the terms "milk", "butter", "cheese", "cream" and "yoghurt" can only be used to market and advertise products derived from animal milk, with a small number of exceptions including coconut milk, peanut butter and ice cream. In 2017, the Landgericht Trier (Trier regional court), Germany, asked the Court of Justice of the European Union, to clarify European food-labeling law (Case C-422/16), with the court stating that plant-based products cannot be marketed as milk, cream, butter, cheese or yoghurt within the European Union because these are reserved for animal products; exceptions to this do not include tofu and soy. Although plant-based dairy alternatives are not allowed to be called "milk", "cheese" and the like, they are allowed to be described as buttery or creamy. In the United Kingdom, strict standards are applied to food labeling for terms such as milk, cheese, cream, yogurt, which are protected  to describe dairy products and may not be used to describe non-dairy produce. However, there are exceptions for each of the EU languages, based on established use of livestock terms for non-livestock products. The list's extent varies widely; for example there is only one exception in Polish, and 20 exceptions in English.

A proposal for further restrictions failed at second reading in the European Parliament, in May 2021. The proposal, called Amendment 171, would have outlawed labels including 'yogurt-style' and 'cheese alternative'.

United States
In the United States, the dairy industry petitioned the FDA to ban the use of terms like "milk", "cheese", "cream" and "butter" on plant-based analogues (except for peanut butter). FDA commissioner, Scott Gottlieb, stated on July 17, 2018 that the term "milk" is used imprecisely in the labeling of non-dairy beverages, such as soy milk, oat milk and almond milk: "An almond doesn't lactate", he said. In 2019, the US National Milk Producers Federation petitioned the FDA to restrict labeling of plant-based milks, claiming they should be described as "imitation". In response, the Plant-Based Foods Association stated the word "imitation" was disparaging, and there was no evidence that consumers were misled or confused about plant-based milks. A 2018 survey by the International Food Information Council Foundation found that consumers in the United States do not typically confuse plant-based analogues with animal milk or dairy products. As of 2021, though the USDA is investigating and various state legislatures are considering regulation, various courts have determined that reasonable consumers are not confused, and the FDA has enacted no regulations against plant-based milk labels.

In 2021, the FDA issued a final rule that amends yogurt's standard of identity (which remains a product of "milk-derived ingredients"), and is expecting to issue industry guidance on "Labeling of Plant-based Milk Alternatives" in 2022.

Proponents of plant-based milk assert that these labeling requirements are infantilizing to consumers and burdensome and unfair on dairy-alternatives. Critics of the FDA's labeling requirements also note that there is often collusion between government officials and the dairy industry in an attempt to maintain dairy dominance in the market. For example, in 2017, Senator Tammy Baldwin (WI) introduced the "Defending Against Imitations and Replacements of Yogurt, Milk, and Cheese to Promote Regular Intake of Dairy Everyday (DAIRY PRIDE) Act" which would prevent almond milk, coconut milk, cashew milk from being labeled with terms like milk, yogurt, and cheese. Proponents of plant-based dairy alternatives note that dairy sales are decreasing faster than plant sales are increasing and that therefore, attacking plant milks as being the chief reason for a decline in dairy consumption is inaccurate. A 2020 USDA study found that the "increase in sales over 2013 to 2017 of plant-based options is one-fifth the size of the decrease in Americans' purchases of cow's milk."

Health recommendations

Health authorities recommend that plant milks should not be given to infants younger than 12 months unless commercially prepared infant formula is available such as soy infant formula. A 2020 clinical review stated that only appropriate commercial infant formulas should be used as alternatives to human milk which contains a substantial source of calcium, vitamin D and protein in the first year of life and that plant milks "do not represent an equivalent source of such nutrients".

The Healthy Drinks, Healthy Kids 2023 guidelines state that infants younger than 12 months should not drink plant milks. They suggest that children between 12 and 24 months may consume fortified soy milk, but not other non-dairy milks such as almond, oat and rice, which are deficient in key nutrients. A 2022 review suggested that the best option for toddlers (1–3 years old) who do not consume cow's milk would be to have at least 250 mL/day of fortified soy milk.

For vegan infants younger than 12 months who are not breastfed, the New Zealand Ministry of Health recommends soy infant formula and advises against the use of plants milks. A 2019 Consensus Statement from the Academy of Nutrition and Dietetics, American Academy of Pediatric Dentistry, American Academy of Pediatrics, and the American Heart Association concluded that plant milks are not recommended for infants younger than 12 months and that for children aged 1–5 years plant milks may be useful for those with allergies or intolerances to cow's milk but should only be consumed after a consultation with a professional health care provider.

See also

 Lactose intolerance
 List of dishes made using coconut milk
 Milk substitute
 Non-dairy creamer
 Plant cream
 Roasted grain drink
 Soy milk maker
 Soy yogurt
 Vegan cheese
 Pea milk

References

External links
Wikibooks Cookbook category for Nut and Grain Milk recipes''

 
Cold drinks
Food ingredients
Imitation foods
Milk substitutes
Non-alcoholic drinks
Vegan cuisine
Vegetarianism and drinks